Dypterygia patina is a moth of the family Noctuidae. It is found in North America, including South Carolina, Texas and Arizona.

Hadeninae
Moths described in 1875